Mustapha Kouici (born 16 April 1954) is a former Algerian international footballer. A left back, he represented Algeria in the 1982 FIFA World Cup, but he did not play in the finals.

References

Individual 
 Africa Cup of Nations Team of the Tournament: 1980

External links
Mustafa Kouici FIFA Record at fifa.com

1954 births
Living people
People from Batna Province
Algerian footballers
Algeria international footballers
1982 FIFA World Cup players
1980 African Cup of Nations players
1982 African Cup of Nations players
African Games gold medalists for Algeria
African Games medalists in football
CR Belouizdad players
Olympique de Médéa players
USM Alger players
Association football defenders
Competitors at the 1978 All-Africa Games
21st-century Algerian people
20th-century Algerian people